The 1966 Alabama gubernatorial election took place on November 8, 1966, and saw the election of Lurleen Wallace as the governor over U.S. Representative James D. Martin. Incumbent Democrat George Wallace was term limited and could not seek a second consecutive term.

Democratic primary

Candidates
 Carl Elliott, former U.S. Representative
 Richmond Flowers, Sr., Attorney General
 Jim Folsom, former Governor
 Bob Gilchrist, State Senator
 Eunice Gore
 John Malcolm Patterson, former Governor
 Sherman Powell
 A.W. Todd, Commissioner of Agriculture and Industries
 Lurleen Wallace, First Lady
 Charles Woods, businessman

Results
The Democratic primary was handily won by Lurleen Wallace, who was running as the proxy of her husband, governor George Wallace. Wallace captured a majority of the vote cast in the first round of the primary and there was therefore no runoff necessary.

General election
Until 1966, the official election of the Democratic nominee had been a foregone conclusion.  This election proved to be a significant departure from that trend, and the showing of James D. Martin proved to the best by a Republican candidate for governor in Alabama since Reconstruction.

References

1966
Gubernatorial
Alabama
November 1966 events in the United States